Kaukonen is a surname. Notable people with the surname include:

Amy Kaukonen (1891–1984), American doctor and politician
Jorma Kaukonen (born 1940), American guitarist
Lauri Kaukonen (1902–1975), Finnish business leader
Peter Kaukonen (born 1945), American guitarist/multi-instrumentalist/songwriter